Bargata (Barğatı) is a rural locality (a village) in Uchpilinsky Selsoviet, Dyurtyulinsky District, Bashkortostan, Russia. The population was 111 as of 2010. There are 2 streets.

Geography 
Bargata is located 33 km northeast of Dyurtyuli (the district's administrative centre) by road. Novobadrakovo is the nearest rural locality.

References 

Rural localities in Dyurtyulinsky District